Extension, extend or extended may refer to:

Mathematics

Logic or set theory
 Axiom of extensionality
 Extensible cardinal
 Extension (model theory)
 Extension (predicate logic), the set of tuples of values that satisfy the predicate
 Extension (semantics), the set of things to which a property applies
 Extension by definitions
 Extensional definition, a definition that enumerates every individual a term applies to
 Extensionality

Other uses
 Extension of a polyhedron, in geometry
 Exterior algebra, Grassmann's theory of extension, in geometry
 Homotopy extension property, in topology
 Kolmogorov extension theorem, in probability theory
 Linear extension, in order theory
 Sheaf extension, in algebraic geometry
 Tietze extension theorem, in topology
 Whitney extension theorem, in differential geometry
 Group extension, in abstract algebra and homological algebra

Music
 Extension (music), notes that fit outside the standard range
 Extended (Solar Fields album), 2005
 Extension (George Braith album), 1964
 Extension (Clare Fischer album), 1963
 Extensions (Ahmad Jamal album), 1965
 Extensions, a 1969 album by Mystic Moods Orchestra
 Extensions (McCoy Tyner album), 1970
 Extensions (Dave Holland album), 1988
 Extensions (The Manhattan Transfer album), 1979

Places
 Extension, British Columbia, a village near Regional District of Nanaimo, British Columbia, Canada
 Extension, Louisiana, unincorporated community, United States

Science
 Extension (geology), relating to the pulling apart of the Earth's crust and lithosphere
 Extension (anatomy), a movement at a joint that increases the angle between the two ends of the joint; the opposite of flexion
 Extension locus, the gene locus of Melanocortin 1 receptor

Other uses
 Browser extension, a small software module for customizing a web browser
 Building extension
 Continuing education, or extension school, a school for continuing education
 Cooperative State Research, Education, and Extension Service, a former division of the U.S. Department of Agriculture
 Extension (metaphysics), the property of stretching out or taking up space
 Extension (telephone), telephone line attached to a main line or to a PBX or Centrex system
 Extension cord, power cable with a plug on one end and one or more sockets on the other end 
 Eyelash extensions, material applied to eyelashes
 Hair extensions, strands of hair added to existing hair
 Extension, the building of community capacity by outsiders, for instance agricultural extension
 Filename extension, for computer file systems

See also 
 Extensive (disambiguation)